Rosine is an unincorporated community in Ohio County, Kentucky, United States. Bill Monroe, The Father of Bluegrass, is buried in the community and memorialized with a bronze cast disk affixed to the barn where his music remains alive. The community was named for the pen name of Jenny Taylor McHenry, poet and wife of founder Henry D. McHenry. The ZIP Code is 42370 and the area code is 270. The nearest communities are Horse Branch, and Beaver Dam; and the nearest major cities are Owensboro and Bowling Green. The community sits at an elevation of 429 feet. At one time, Rosine was a thriving community with several stores, a school, a pickle factory, and a bat mill that milled bats for the Louisville Slugger bat factory.

Demographics

Schools
There are no schools in Rosine, so students from Rosine attend Horse Branch Elementary School, Ohio County Middle School, and Ohio County High School. Nearby private schools include Sugar Grove Christian Academy and Ohio County Christian Academy. The nearest colleges and universities are in Owensboro.

Major roads
U.S. Route 62 passes through Rosine. The town is north of the Western Kentucky Parkway and east of Interstate 165.

Bluegrass music

Each Friday night, year round, musicians converge on the town of Rosine to play Bluegrass music. The musicians play in the small general store, outside the store and in a weekly stage show in the barn next to the store. An annual Bluegrass Festival is held in the town and another annual festival is held on the nearby Jerusalem Ridge where Monroe was born. Bill's musician brothers Birch Monroe and Charlie Monroe were also from Rosine. As of May 2017 ground was broken for the building of the Bill Monroe museum. There is also the Bluemoon store located on  Hwy 62E in Rosine.

Notable buildings
 Rosine General Store and Barn, registered historic place
 Bill Monroe Museum, about early bluegrass music

References

External links
 Bill Monroe's Homeplace / Rosine Barn Jamboree

Unincorporated communities in Kentucky
Unincorporated communities in Ohio County, Kentucky